Hans Brodmerkel  (29 March 1887 – 2 February 1932) was a German politician and revolutionary activist. A co-founder of the Communist Party of Germany (KPD), Brodmerkel was Chairman of the workers' and soldiers' council in the Bremen Soviet Republic, and a member of the Parliament of Bremen.

Biography
Born in Burgebrach (Upper Franconia) in 1887, Brodmerkel moved to Bremen in 1911, becoming a butcher. Since 1912 he was a member of the Association of Butchers. Before 1914 he was a member of the Social Democratic Party of Germany, and during the First World War he was Chairman of the Association of Butchers. As a co-founder of Arbeiterpolitik and a member of the Bremer Linksradikale, the Social Democrats' radical left-wing in Bremen, he was briefly imprisoned in June 1916 for distributing illegal pamphlets.

Brodmerkel was a delegate of the Bremen left-wing radicals during the April 6, 1917 founding conference of the Independent Social Democratic Party of Germany (USPD), in Gotha. He was later member of a commission for the foundation of a left-wing party in July–August 1917 in Berlin, and in 1918 a member of the Internationale Kommunisten Deutschland, a short-lived predecessor to Communist Party of Germany. Soon after, Brodmerkel participated in the founding congress of the KPD (30 December 1918 – 1 January 1919).

When the German Revolution of 1918–19 broke out, Brodmerkel first served as Vice Chairman of the Action Committee founded in a Faulenstraße union hall by four USPD members and three left-wing radicals, among them Brodmerkel. After the election of a hundred and eighty deputies the Action Committee was completed, and a workers' and soldiers' council was formed. Brodmerkel later became its Chairman, and participated in the founding of the Bremen Soviet Republic, which was put down by the government shortly afterwards.

After the failure of the revolution, Brodmerkel was elected a deputy of the Bürgerschaft (Parliament) of Bremen in 1923, as a representative of the Communist Party. Clashes ensued within the Bremen branch of the KPD in 1924, after Eugen Eppstein had been designated district manager by the 'ultra-left' in the KPD Berlin headquarters in May. In early 1925, Brodmerkel was expelled from the Communist Party together with Adolf Ehlers and Wilhelm Deisen on charges of being right-wing, but was readmitted by the end of the year. Again expelled in 1929, Brodmerkel joined the Communist Party of Germany (Opposition) instead.

He died in Bremen on 2 February 1932, only months before the July federal elections, which for the first time saw Nazi Party gain larger support than the SDP and KPD put together.

References

Bibliography

 
 
 
 

Social Democratic Party of Germany politicians
Independent Social Democratic Party politicians
Communist Party of Germany politicians
Communist Party of Germany (Opposition) politicians
German revolutionaries
People of the German Revolution of 1918–1919
1887 births
1932 deaths